Zvm may refer to:

 ZEN Vision:M, The ZEN Vision:M  portable media player developed by Creative Technology
 z/VM, IBM's VM family of virtual machine operating systems